Oaky Grove is a historic house located in Shotwell, Wake County, North Carolina, a suburb of Raleigh. Built in 1818 by Thomas Price, Oaky Grove has been home to generations of the Price, Blake, and Doub families. Today, the  property is owned by the Doubs family and contains the two-story Federal style home, a smokehouse, barn, and the family cemetery.

In September 1993, Oaky Grove was listed on the National Register of Historic Places.

See also
 List of Registered Historic Places in North Carolina

References

Plantation houses in North Carolina
Houses on the National Register of Historic Places in North Carolina
Houses completed in 1818
Federal architecture in North Carolina
Houses in Wake County, North Carolina
National Register of Historic Places in Wake County, North Carolina